Ross O'Donoghue (born 9 February 1983 in Glasgow) is a Scottish football player currently without a club.

O'Donoghue started his career with Scottish Premier League side Aberdeen, before spending four years in the juniors. He returned to the Scottish Football League in 2007 with Elgin City.

Career

O'Donoghue started his career as a youth player with Aberdeen, before playing with junior sides Cumbernauld United and Pollok. He moved back into the senior game with Elgin City in 2007, where he became captain, before moving for a season to Dumbarton. He returned to Elgin in the summer of 2010.

In the summer of 2013, O'Donoghue signed for East Stirlingshire after being released by Elgin.

References

External links

1983 births
Living people
Footballers from Glasgow
Scottish footballers
Aberdeen F.C. players
Cumbernauld United F.C. players
Dumbarton F.C. players
Elgin City F.C. players
Scottish Football League players
Scottish Premier League players
Scottish Junior Football Association players
Association football midfielders
Scottish Professional Football League players
Pollok F.C. players
East Stirlingshire F.C. players